Commonwealth Jazz Club is a 1965 music television miniseries which was co-produced in Australia, Canada and the United Kingdom.

Premise
Jazz music performances were featured in this six-programme co-production of ABC (Australia), the BBC (Britain) and CBC Television (Canada). Each nation produced two half-hour episodes for the series.

Scheduling
In Canada four of the Commonwealth Jazz Club episodes, including both Canadian contributions, were broadcast on CBC Television Thursdays at 10:30 p.m. (Eastern) from 9 to 30 September 1965.

Episodes
 Australia: (Peter Page director) Graeme Bell and his All Stars
 Australia: (Peter Page director) Don Burrows Quartet with Judy Bailey (piano)
 Canada: (Paddy Sampson producer) Jimmy Dale Orchestra and the Sonny Greenwich Quartet
 Canada: (Paddy Sampson producer) Tony Collacott Trio (Collacott piano, Bob Price acoustic double bass, Ricky Marcus drums) and the Rob McConnell Quartet (McConnell trombone, Ed Bickert guitar, Bill Britto acoustic double bass, Bruce Farquhar drums)
 United Kingdom: (Colin Charman director) Benny Green presenter, The Commonwealth Big Band (Tubby Hayes music director, Bob Burns, Art Ellefson, Freddy Logan acoustic double bass, Ronnie Ross reeds, Ray Swinfield, Gib Wallace trombone, Kenny Wheeler trumpet)
 United Kingdom: (Colin Charman director) Benny Green presenter, Kenny Baker trumpet, Tony Coe, Jackie Dougan drums, Spike Heatley acoustic double bass, Dudley Moore piano, Tommy Whittle tenor sax.

References

External links
 

Australian Broadcasting Corporation original programming
BBC Television shows
CBC Television original programming
1960s British music television series
1960s Canadian music television series
1965 Australian television series debuts
1965 Australian television series endings
1965 British television series debuts
1965 British television series endings
1965 Canadian television series debuts
1965 Canadian television series endings
Black-and-white British television shows
Black-and-white Australian television shows